Earth Interactions (EI) is a peer-reviewed scientific journal published by the American Meteorological Society, American Geophysical Union, and Association of American Geographers. EI publishes research on the interactions among the atmosphere, hydrosphere, biosphere, cryosphere, and lithosphere, including, but not limited to, research on human impacts, such as land cover change, irrigation, dams/reservoirs, urbanization, pollution, and landslides.

Abstracting and indexing 
The journal is abstracted and indexed by Compendex, GEOBASE, GeoRef, Scopus, Current Contents, and EBSCO, and ProQuest databases.

See also 
 List of scientific journals in earth and atmospheric sciences

References 

Earth and atmospheric sciences journals
Publications established in 1997
English-language journals
American Geophysical Union academic journals
Geology journals
American Meteorological Society academic journals
American Association of Geographers
Online-only journals